Terje Andersen (born 4 March 1952) is a former speed skater and president of the Norwegian Skating Association. Andersen was a typical middle distance skater, his best achievement being one bronze medal from the 1980 Winter Olympics of Lake Placid.

Andersen participated several times in the World Sprint Championships, finishing fourth in 1981, and sixth in 1978. His best placing in an allround championships is a twelfth place at the World Championships of Oslo in 1975.

He represented Tønsberg TF and Holmestrand og Botne SK. He was president of the Norwegian Skating Association from 1997 to 1999, and again in 2003 to 2007.

Medals
An overview of medals won by Andersen at important championships he participated in, listing the years in which he won each:

Personal records
To put these personal records in perspective, the WR column lists the official world records on the dates that Andersen skated his personal records.

Andersen has an Adelskalender score of 168.250 points.

References 

 Terje Andersen at SkateResults.com
 Terje Andersen. Deutsche Eisschnelllauf Gemeinschaft e.V. (German Skating Association).
 Personal records from Jakub Majerski's Speedskating Database
 Evert Stenlund's Adelskalender pages
 Historical World Records. International Skating Union.
 National Championships results. Norwegian Skating Association.

1952 births
Living people
Norwegian male speed skaters
Olympic speed skaters of Norway
Olympic bronze medalists for Norway
Speed skaters at the 1976 Winter Olympics
Speed skaters at the 1980 Winter Olympics
Norwegian sports executives and administrators
People from Vestfold
Olympic medalists in speed skating
Medalists at the 1980 Winter Olympics